This is a list of years in Russia.

16th century

17th century

18th century

19th century

20th century

21st century

See also
 Timeline of Russian history

 
Russia history-related lists
Russia